Metal Mad is the twenty-first studio album by Japanese heavy metal band Loudness. It was released in 2008 only in Japan. It would be the last album before Munetaka Higuchi's death in November 2008.

Track listing
Music by Akira Takasaki, lyrics by Minoru Niihara

"Fire of Spirit" (instrumental) - 2:58
"Metal Mad" - 4:11
"High Flyer" - 5:06
"Spellbound #9" - 5:45
"Crimson Paradox" - 4:34
"Black and White" - 4:44
"Whatsoever" - 5:06
"Call of the Reaper" - 4:06
"Can't Find My Way" - 7:02
"Gravity" - 5:21
"Transformation" - 4:48

Personnel
Loudness
Minoru Niihara - vocals
Akira Takasaki - guitars
Masayoshi Yamashita - bass
Munetaka Higuchi - drums

Production
Masatoshi Sakimoto - engineer, mixing
Yuki Mitome - assistant engineer
Yasuji Yasuman Maeda - mastering
Hirose Shiraishi - supervisor
Kiyomasa Shinoki - executive producer
Steve Johnstad, Takashi Kanazawa - lyrics translations

References

2008 albums
Loudness (band) albums
Japanese-language albums
Tokuma Shoten albums